X̱á:ytem is an indigenous archaeological site and the name of a related museum run under the auspices of the Stoːlo people at Hatzic, British Columbia, Canada. X̱á:ytem is approximately 80 kilometres east of Vancouver on Highway 7. It is reached via the bridge at Mission, about 15 kilometres from the border with the US state of Washington. The site was designated in 1992 as a national historic site of Canada for its spiritual value to the Stoːlo people, as well as being one of the oldest discovered habitation sites at approximately 5000 years old. It was listed on the Canadian register of historic places in 2005.  It is also known as Hatzic Rock National Historic Site of Canada.

History
Indigenous peoples occupied this area along the northern bank of the Fraser River for thousands of years. The historical peoples who encountered European colonists were the Stoːlo.

A large moss-covered boulder, known as a transformer rock and of deep spiritual importance, has survived from ancient times. According to the book You Are Asked to Witness, the transformer god XaːIs was travelling through the land and punished three  for not adopting new ways to preserve and protect Stóːlō traditions and knowledge. To teach them a lesson, the god transformed them into stone.

Over time, during the years after alienation of native lands by colonization, the site of X̱á:ytem had been used as a pasture. The property is adjacent to a highway built in the early 20th century. After it was sold to a developer and initial work on grading the site was begun, concerns about the site's potential archaeological value prompted an examination by Gordon Mohs. This led to the dramatic finding that it was immensely ancient, and it has been ranked among the oldest-known habitation sites in North America.

Following the discovery, the government arranged to transfer the land to the Stóːlō, the First Nation that has historically been in the area, for archaeological and museum purposes. It paid the erstwhile owner  compensation for his lost opportunity in development; an extensive residential subdivision had been planned. The Stóːlō have built a museum, the X̱á:ytem Longhouse Interpretive Centre, to educate visitors about the site.

Excavations have been carried out in consultation with the Stóːlō. Researchers have found at the habitation site "evidence of rectangular pit/ longhouses of long-term occupation with remains of post, hearth and floor features, trade goods, storage, food, and spiritual activity."

See also

Archaeology of the Americas
Arlington Springs Man - 
Calico Early Man Site - 
Cueva de las Manos  - 
Buhl Woman - 
Fort Rock Cave - 
Kennewick Man - 
Kwäday Dän Tsʼìnchi - 
Marmes Rockshelter - 
Luzia Woman - 
Mummy Cave - 
Paisley Caves  -

References

External links
 X̱á:ytem Longhouse Interpretive Centre
 A Journey into a New Land, Simon Fraser University Museum of Archeology and Ethnology, 2005, scientific documentary 
 A Journey into Time Immemorial, Simon Fraser University Museum of Archeology and Ethnology, 2008, cultural and artistic account of ancient peoples

Archaeological sites in British Columbia
History of British Columbia
Museums in British Columbia
First Nations museums in Canada
First Nations culture
Sto:lo
Heritage sites in British Columbia
National Historic Sites in British Columbia